Christian Graham "Chris" Senn (born 1972/1973) is a video game designer perhaps best known for his work on Sonic X-treme, the unfinished Sega Saturn game, during his stay at the Sega Technical Institute, where he also worked on The Ooze, Comix Zone, and Die Hard Arcade. More recently, he has worked as a game designer at companies such as Big Red Button Entertainment, Magic Pixel Games, GridMob, Luxoflux, and Treyarch on titles including Carnival Island, Lady Gaga iOki, Jason Derulo iOki, Spider-Man 3, Call of Duty: Finest Hour, True Crime: New York City, Shrek 2, and True Crime: Streets of L.A..

Senn began his training after high school as a character animator at the California Institute of the Arts. His second summer job at Acme Interactive in 1992 marked the beginning of his videogame career as an artist and animator. Over the next twenty years, Senn transitioned to focus more on videogame design, but never lost his passion for visuals. He still employs both to this day.

Senn has also worked freelance creating websites, book illustrations, business card printing, caricatures, and creative consultation. and goes by the alias "kurisu" on his Senntient.com Gaming Forums.

On December 23, 2015, Christian Senn shut down the forums, overhauled the site, and re-branded Sentient as a family-friendly card and board game company rather than a portfolio, as was previously. His first distribution was a set of cards gifted to his forum members as a "thank-you". The cards included the user's avatars, join date and post count along with an instruction manual on how to play the game.

Production history
Battle Cars (1992) – Artist
BattleTech: A Game of Armored Combat (1993) – Artist, Animator
Comix Zone (1995) – Artist, Animator
Sonic X-treme (1996) – Co-Lead Designer, Art Director, Team Lead
Die Hard Arcade (1999) – Special Thanks
Cuboingo (2002) – Lead Designer, Art Director, Composer
True Crime: Streets of LA (2003) – Additional City Designer
Shrek 2 (2004) – Game Designer
Call of Duty: Finest Hour (2004) – Game Designer (Ksar Tarsine)
True Crime: New York City (2005) – Design Manager, Game Designer
Spider-Man 3 (2007) – UI Designer
Lady Gaga Ioki (2010) – UI Artist
Jason Derulo iOki (2010) – UI Artist
EcoGoGo! (2010) – Lead Designer, Art Director, Composer
Carnival Island (2011) – Game Designer
Sonic Boom: Rise of Lyric (2014) – Game designer

References

External links

Official forums

American video game designers
Year of birth missing (living people)
Living people
1970s births